Freddy Antonio García (born October 6, 1976), is a former Venezuelan professional baseball pitcher. He is best known for his many seasons with seven Major League Baseball (MLB) franchises, including the Seattle Mariners, Chicago White Sox, and New York Yankees. Garcia has also pitched in the Chinese Professional Baseball League (CPBL), Mexican League, and Venezuelan Professional Baseball League.

García's best year was in 2001 in which he led the American League in innings pitched and ERA. He made the All-Star team in 2001 and 2002. In 2005, he was a member of the World Series winning Chicago White Sox and started the series-winning Game 4.

Professional career

Seattle Mariners
Originally signed by the Houston Astros as a non-draft amateur free agent in 1993, García was acquired by Seattle in 1998, along with Carlos Guillén and John Halama in the trade that sent Randy Johnson to the Astros.

During García's rookie season, he pitched 201 innings, compiling a 17–8 record with 170 strikeouts and a 4.07 ERA in 33 starts. After going 9–5 in his second season, he went on to compile a 45–42 win–loss record over the course of the next three and a half seasons with Seattle. His strongest season was in 2001, when he earned 18 of the Mariners' American League record-setting 116 wins and led the AL with  innings pitched and a 3.05 earned run average. He finished third in AL Cy Young Award voting that year.

On June 27, 2004, García and Ben Davis were traded to the Chicago White Sox in exchange for Michael Morse, Miguel Olivo, and Jeremy Reed. As a Mariner, García posted a 76–50 record with a 3.89 ERA and 819 strikeouts.

Chicago White Sox
García was the starting pitcher in Game 4 of the 2005 World Series for the Chicago White Sox, pitching seven scoreless innings against the Houston Astros. The White Sox won the game and the World Series, completing a four-game sweep.

García experienced a bit of controversy at the beginning of the 2006 season when he tested positive for marijuana during the World Baseball Classic.

In 2006, he surpassed 1,000 strikeouts for his career. In eight post-season games, he was 5–2 with a 3.56 ERA in 48 innings. Also during 2006, on April 29, García recorded his 103rd career win in a game against the Los Angeles Angels of Anaheim, surpassing former White Sox left-hander Wilson Álvarez as the Venezuelan native with the most career wins in Major League history. He finished the season 17–9 with a 4.53 ERA.  He was given the nickname "Big Game" while a member of the White Sox.

Philadelphia Phillies

In December 2006, García was traded to the Philadelphia Phillies for prospects Gavin Floyd and Gio González.

García experienced a shoulder injury that limited his performance for the first several months of the season. He was placed on the disabled list (DL) in June, and had shoulder surgery in August. García made 11 starts before being placed on the DL and earned one win.

Detroit Tigers
In August 2008, García signed a minor league contract with the Detroit Tigers. In his first 2 minor league starts with the Tigers he pitched 5 innings, gave up no runs, and struck out 5. In his Tigers debut in late September, García, with a limited pitch count, threw 5 scoreless innings to get the win.

New York Mets
In January 2009, García agreed to a minor league deal with the New York Mets. He was released on April 28, 2009, after two bad starts for the Buffalo Bisons.

Second stint with the Chicago White Sox
On June 8, 2009, the Chicago White Sox signed García to a minor league contract. García started on August 18 against the Kansas City Royals for the first time with the White Sox since 2006.

In his first game back with the White Sox, García went 4.1 IP allowing 5 ER in a losing effort. García finished the 2009 season with a 3–4 record and a 4.34 ERA.

On October 5, 2009, the Chicago White Sox exercised their 2010 option on García, adding that the 34-year-old made a $1 million base salary, plus a possible $2 million in incentives.

New York Yankees

On January 31, 2011, García agreed to a minor league contract with the New York Yankees worth $1.5 million. On March 25, 2011, the Yankees announced that García would be added to the major league starting rotation. He finished the 2011 season with a solid 12–8 record and a 3.62 ERA, however, he was consistently hammered by teams with .500 or better records, most notably the Boston Red Sox. García was on the mound in relief as the Sox won their second game of the season on April 10, as well as 2 other losses on May 15 and June 7. However, García did manage to defeat the Red Sox on September 24.

García also lost his only playoff start in Game 2 as the Yankees were defeated by the Detroit Tigers in the American League Division Series in five games. Despite this, the Yankees offered him a one-year deal worth $4 million with incentives for the 2012 season. The deal became official on December 9.

In 2012, García was expected to challenge for a starting spot with Phil Hughes, A. J. Burnett, Andy Pettitte and Michael Pineda. However, Burnett was traded in the offseason, and Pineda was diagnosed with a shoulder injury, thereby allowing García into the rotation.

García began the 2012 season with bad footing as he threw 5 wild pitches in his first start against the Baltimore Orioles. He was demoted to the bullpen after going 0–2 in April with a 12.51 ERA, averaging only 3.1 innings per start. David Phelps was moved into the starting rotation.

García immediately improved once in the bullpen. In his two-month relief stint, he posted a 1.56 ERA in 17.1 innings. His sinker's speed also improved, from an average of 87.1 mph in April to 88.6 in May/June.

A fibula injury to Andy Pettitte in late June brought García back into the rotation. Overall, Garcia finished the 2012 season with a 7–6 record and a 5.20 ERA in 30 games appeared (17 started).

Baltimore Orioles
On January 28, 2013, García signed a minor league deal with the San Diego Padres. He was released by the Padres on March 24. He was promptly signed to a minor league contract by the Baltimore Orioles, and assigned to the Triple-A Norfolk Tides. He was called up on May 4 to make his Orioles debut on the road at Anaheim. He was designated for assignment on June 24, 2013. Three days later, García signed another minor league contract and returned to Norfolk.

Atlanta Braves
On August 23, 2013, Garcia was acquired by the Atlanta Braves for cash considerations. Garcia pitched effectively for the Braves, going 1–2 with a 1.65 ERA in September (1–1, 1.83 ERA in 3 starts). He earned a start in game four of the NLDS. Although the Braves lost to the Los Angeles Dodgers, Garcia pitched well, giving up 2 runs over 6 innings and was in line for the win when he left the game.

He returned to the Braves on a minor league contract signed January 24, 2014. He was released on March 24.

EDA Rhinos
On April 18, 2014, García signed  with the EDA Rhinos of the Chinese Professional Baseball League (CPBL). The seven-month deal included incentives that increased its worth up to $392,000, and was the most lucrative in CPBL history until Lin Chih-sheng signed a 3-year deal for $1.36 million in January 2016. In his first game for the Rhinos on May 10, 2014, García pitched six innings of shutout ball on four hits in a no-decision before being pulled after 77 pitches. The Rhinos won the game 5–0 against the Chinatrust Brother Elephants in front of a sellout crowd of more than 12,000.

Final season
Garcia opened the season with the Olmecas de Tabasco of the Mexican Baseball League, before signing a minor league contract with the Los Angeles Dodgers on March 30, 2015. He was assigned to the AAA Oklahoma City Dodgers. He appeared in four games and made one start for Oklahoma City, allowing seven runs in 7.1 innings and was released on April 21. He rejoined the Olmecas de Tabasco in June, then was traded to the Sultanes de Monterrey. In September Garcia was assigned to the Tigres de Aragua. He spent the rest of 2015 with Aragua, where he won a league championship, and started the first and final games of the 2016 Caribbean Series. He retired after the series concluded.

Sultanes de Monterrey
On April 8, 2016, Garcia came out of retirement and signed with the Sultanes de Monterrey of the Mexican Baseball League. He was released on May 3, 2016.

Leones de Yucatán
On March 5, 2018, García signed with the Leones de Yucatán of the Mexican Baseball League. He was released on April 23, 2018.

Garcia was eligible to be elected in the Hall of Fame in 2019, but received less than 5% of the vote, and became ineligible for the 2020 ballot.

Pitching style
García threw a fastball that topped out in the 90s in his prime and a hard slider. He also threw a two-seam fastball, a curveball, a split-finger fastball and occasionally used a changeup.

García was once a power pitcher, but as he got older, García lost velocity on his pitches and compensated by developing a broad repertoire of up to six or seven pitches. In the 2013 season, García threw the following pitches, in order of their use:
 Four-seam fastball — 86–90 mph
 Slider — 78–82 mph
 Curveball — 72–76 mph
 Splitter — 78–82 mph
 Changeup — 80–84 mph
 Sinker — 86–90 mph

García has also adjusted his approach to the strike zone, being especially careful not to leave pitches in the middle of the plate: "He doesn't really have the electric stuff, so he's going to stay on the corners and stay out of the zone."

See also

 List of Major League Baseball players from Venezuela

References

External links

Freddy Garcia  at Baseball Gauge
Freddy Garcia at Pura Pelota (Venezuelan Professional Baseball League)

1976 births
Living people
American League All-Stars
American League ERA champions
Atlanta Braves players
Baltimore Orioles players
Bristol White Sox players
Buffalo Bisons (minor league) players
Caribes de Anzoátegui players
Charlotte Knights players
Chicago White Sox players
Clearwater Threshers players
Detroit Tigers players
EDA Rhinos players
Everett AquaSox players
Gulf Coast Astros players
Florida Complex League Phillies players
Gwinnett Braves players
Jackson Generals (Texas League) players
Kannapolis Intimidators players
Kissimmee Cobras players
Lakeland Flying Tigers players
Leones de Yucatán players
Major League Baseball pitchers
Major League Baseball players from Venezuela
Mexican League baseball pitchers
Navegantes del Magallanes players
New Orleans Zephyrs players
New York Yankees players
Norfolk Tides players
Oklahoma City Dodgers players
Olmecas de Tabasco players
Philadelphia Phillies players
Quad City River Bandits players
Scranton/Wilkes-Barre Yankees players
Seattle Mariners players
Baseball players from Caracas
Sultanes de Monterrey players
Tacoma Rainiers players
Tigres de Aragua players
Toledo Mud Hens players
Venezuelan expatriate baseball players in Mexico
Venezuelan expatriate baseball players in Taiwan
Venezuelan expatriate baseball players in the United States
World Baseball Classic players of Venezuela
2006 World Baseball Classic players
2015 WBSC Premier12 players